Leadbetterella byssophila  is a Gram-negative, aerobic rod-shaped and non-motile bacterium from the genus Leadbetterella which has been isolated from cotton waste compost in Korea.

References

External links
Type strain of Leadbetterella byssophila at BacDive -  the Bacterial Diversity Metadatabase	

Cytophagia
Bacteria described in 2005